Pierre Cazeneuve (born 11 March 1995) French politician of La République En Marche! eho has been serving as a member of the National Assembly for Hauts-de-Seine's 7th constituency since 2022.

Political career
In parliament, Cazeneuve serves as member of the Committee on Sustainable Development, Spatial and Regional Planning. In this capacity, he has been his parliamentary group's rapporteur on renewable energy since 2022.

In addition to his committee assignments, Cazeneuve is part of the parliamentary friendship groups with New Zealand, the United States, China, Germany, the United Kingdom, Israel and Madagascar.

References

1995 births
Living people
People from Saint-Cloud

La République En Marche! politicians
Deputies of the 16th National Assembly of the French Fifth Republic
21st-century French politicians
Sciences Po alumni
HEC Paris alumni
Members of Parliament for Hauts-de-Seine